The 2000 Isle of Man TT was a motorcycle race event. The Isle of Man TT (Tourist Trophy) Races are held annually in the Isle of Man. The 2000 races were dominated by David Jefferies and Joey Dunlop, who gained a hat-trick of wins each.  They included Dunlop's 26th and final win at the TT in the Ultra-lightweight 125cc race, and he also proved he could still win a 'big bike' race, winning the Formula One TT in the opening race.  This was also Michael Rutter's last TT until his return in 2007.

Rob Fisher won both sidecar races bringing his total up to eight wins.

Results
Race 1 – TT Formula One Race (6 laps – 226.38 miles)

Race 2 – Sidecar Race A (3 laps – 113.19miles)

Race 3a – Lightweight 250 TT Race (3 laps – 113.19 miles)

Race 3b – Lightweight 400 TT Race (3 laps – 113.19 miles)

Race 4 – Sidecar Race B (3 laps – 113.19 miles)

Race 5 – Ultra Lightweight 125 TT (4 laps – 150.92 miles)

Race 6 – Singles TT (4 laps – 150.92 miles)

Race 7 – Junior TT 600cc (4 laps – 150.92 miles)

Race 8 – Production TT

Race 9 – Senior TT Race (6 laps – 226.38 miles)

External links
2000 Isle of Man TT results

Isle of Man Tt
2000
Isle of Man TT
2000 in motorcycle sport